Financial secretary is an administrative and executive government position within the governance of a state, corporation, private or public organization, small group or other body with financial assets.

A financial secretary oversees policy concerning the flow of financial resources like money in and out of an organization.  The officer sometimes determines policy concerning the purchase or sale of goods and services, collection of dues and employment.  The officer implements policy with the cooperation of other executives.

Financial secretary can also be the title of a cabinet member in a number of former and current British dependencies. This is the case in Hong Kong (see Financial Secretary (Hong Kong)), Jamaica, Montserrat, Saint Helena, etc. In the United Kingdom, the Financial Secretary to the Treasury is a junior minister position but the office holder attends the meetings of the cabinet.

Bibliography
SABINO, Rosimeri F.;ROCHA, Fabio G. Secretariado: do escriba ao web writer. Rio de Janeiro (Brazil): Brasport, 2004.
 Revista Excelência. FENASSEC. Trimestral. Brazil.

Management occupations
Office and administrative support occupations